Kirpa is a union council in the Islamabad Capital Territory of Pakistan.

References 

Union councils of Islamabad Capital Territory